Moberg may refer to:
 7360 Moberg, asteroid
 Moberg (surname)
 The Brothers Moberg

See also 
 Morris "Moe" Berg (1902–1972), American baseball player and spy